The Concord Marines was the only moniker of the minor league baseball teams based in Concord, New Hampshire. Between 1886 and 1907, Concord teams played as members of the New Hampshire State League in 1886, New England League from 1902 to 1905 and New Hampshire League in 1907, winning the 1905 league championship. During a 1904 game, the Marines ran short on players due to illness and inserted their mascot, a 9 year old boy, into the game.

History
In 1886, minor league baseball began in Concord, when the team joined the five–team Independent level New Hampshire State League. The 1886 New Hampshire League featured teams in the New Hampshire cities of Concord, Manchester (Manchester hosted three teams, including West Manchester and "Amoskeag"), and Nashua. The 1886 Concord roster, standings and record are unknown.

In 1902, the Concord "Marines" resumed minor league play. Concord became members of the eight–team Class B level New England League. The Marines ended the season in 4th place with a record of 58–53, as John Carney served as manager. Concord finished 16.5 games behind 1st place Manchester team.

Continuing play, the Concord Marines placed 4th in the 1903 New England League standings. With a record of 63–47. playing under managers John Carney and Frank Eustace, the Marines finished 7.5 games behind the 1st place Lowell Tigers in the final standings. 

The Concord Marines placed 5th in the 1904 New England League standings. With a 62–62 record under manager Nathan Pulsifer, Concord ended the 1904 New England League season 20.5 games behind the 1st place Haverhill Hustlers (82–41).

On June 25, 1904, in a game at Lowell, Concord became short on players after their center fielder was ejected and the second baseman became ill. As a result, Concord put their mascot into the game to play. The nine-year-old boy, named George Dwiggins, likely became the youngest player to appear in a professional game. It was reported that Dwiggins played right field and struck out in his only at bat.

The 1905 New England League standings saw the Concord Marines win the championship. Concord finished the season with a record of 69–39 to place 1st in the final standings under manager Frank Eustace. Concord finished the season, 2.0 games ahead the 2nd place Fall River Indians, who had a 66–40 record. Despite winning the championship, the Concord franchise folded following the 1905 season and did not return to the 1906 New England League.

Concord played their final season in 1907. Concord returned to the Class D level New Hampshire State League. The team ended the season with a 2-7 record under manager A. Long. The New Hampshire State League began play in the 1907 season as a Class D level league. It was an eight–team league that began play on May 11, 1907. During the 1907 season, the New Hampshire State League folded four teams.  A meeting was held on June 17, 1907, where the league was restructured and changed its name to the Vermont State League, beginning play July 2, 1907.

The standings for the New Hampshire State League were affected by four franchises who did not play the complete season. The standings through June 29, 1907, were Barre-Montpelier Intercities 19–6, Burlington Burlingtons 13–12, West Manchester 11–12, Laconia/Plattsburgh Brewers 8–14, East Manchester 7–7, Franklin 5–7, Nashua 3–3, Concord 2–7.

Concord, New Hampshire was without minor league baseball for over a century, until the 2016 New Hampshire Wild began play as members of the Independent level Empire Professional Baseball League.

The ballpark
The name of the home minor league ballpark for the Concord minor league teams is not directly referenced. Established in the 1890s, White Park was noted to have hosted baseball in the era, with a ballfield constructed around 1900. White Park is on the National Register of Historic Places and is still in use today as a public park with ballfields.

Timeline

Year–by–year records

Notable alumni

Joe Berry (1903)
Jack Carney (1902–1903, MGR)
Win Clark (1904)
Doc Curley (1905)
Tom Doran (1902)
Sam Edmonston (1905)
Frank Eustace (1905, MGR)
Sam Frock (1905)
Joe Harris (1903)
Charlie Hastings (1904)
Malachi Hogan (1902)
Buck Hooker (1902–1903)
Happy Iott (1902)
Charlie Jordan (1904)
Joe Knotts (1905)
Jack McAleese (1902)
Arch McCarthy (1903)
Nate Pulsifer (1903)
Hack Schumann (1903)
John Titus (1903)
Irv Young (1904)
Elmer Zacher (1905)

See also
Concord Marines players

References

External links
Concord - Baseball Reference

Defunct minor league baseball teams
Defunct baseball teams in New Hampshire
New England League teams
Baseball teams disestablished in 1902
Baseball teams disestablished in 1905
Concord, New Hampshire